Gorno Orizari may refer to:
 Gorno Orizari, Bitola, North Macedonia
 Gorno Orizari, Veles, North Macedonia